Elena Kononova (Moscow, August 17, 1969 - May 22, 2014) was a Russian soccer player.

With the Russian national team, she participated in the UEFA Women's Championship in 1993, 1995 and 1997.

See also 
1997 UEFA Women's Championship squads

External links 
 
 Elena Kononova profile at Voetbal.com

Russian women's footballers
1969 births
2014 deaths
Footballers from Moscow
Women's association football forwards
CSK VVS Samara (women's football club) players
Russia women's international footballers
20th-century Russian women